Haim Michael Revivo (born 22 February 1972) is an Israeli former professional footballer, who played as an attacking midfielder or winger, and a businessman.

Early life
Revivo is Jewish and was born to a traditional Mizrahi Jewish family in Ashdod, Israel. One of his grandmothers is from Morocco.

Club career
Revivo played football at Hapoel Ashdod until the age of 16 when he transferred to the youth club of Gadna Tel Aviv Yehuda. Revivo liked that the club had no senior team and he would be a free agent once he reached 18. When he turned 19, Giora Spiegel brought him to Bnei Yehuda after both Hapoel Kfar Saba and Maccabi Petah Tikva turned him down. Revivo spent three seasons at Bnei Yehuda before transferring to city rivals, Hapoel.

When Reuven Atar requested to leave Maccabi Haifa for Hapoel Haifa, Ya'akov Shahar was quick to sign a replacement. He brought in Revivo, who was happy to join Haifa since he believed that from there he could get to a European club. In his first season with Haifa, Revivo led the league (along with Amir Turgeman) with 17 goals. In his second season, he wanted to move from the left side of the midfield to the center of the pitch. Then club manager, Giora Spiegel, was reluctant but in order to avoid a fight with his star, he released Alon Mizrahi. Revivo paid off dividends and was once again the league leading goal scorer. Haifa was quick to sell their star to Spanish club, Celta de Vigo.

Revivo became a starter at Celta Vigo. In October 1996, shortly after Revivo joined the club, he made headlines because of the club's league clash on Yom Kippur. Revivo desperately wanted to avoid the match that fell on the Jewish holiday. The club was able to move the match fixture ahead by a couple of hours and Revivo played for as long he could before being brought off in the second half to hurry home for the holiday. He played in Spain a few successful years, and was very popular in Spain. He was named co-winner of the 1998 Israel Sports Figure of the Year Award.

His first two years with Fenerbahçe were a success, and he led the team to the 2001 Turkish championship, but then he lost the attention of the club's management after other famous foreign players were brought in. He decided to leave, and caused much controversy with his move to Istanbul rivals Galatasaray. His spell at Galatasaray only lasted a year before he left Turkey.

After his return to Israel, he signed for Israel's F.C. Ashdod, but after 12 games he retired from football. He is now a successful businessman and one of the former owners of F.C. Ashdod.

International career
Revivo made his first appearance for a national side on 18 December 1990, playing with the Israel national under-18 football team against their Portuguese counterparts at the Estádio da Luz in Lisbon. Revivo played in the midfield along with Avi Nimni and Eyal Berkovic who he would end up playing with most of his national team career.

A year and a half later, Revivo debuted with the Israel national under-21 football team on 13 May 1992 in a friendly against their Turkish counterparts at Herzliya Municipal Stadium in Israel. He scored on his debut and added another four goals in nine appearances, including a brace in a 1994 UEFA European Under-21 Football Championship qualifier against Austria.

Six months after making his under-21 debut, he represented the full side in a 1994 FIFA World Cup qualifier at Ramat Gan Stadium against Sweden. Revivo became a fixture in the national team lineup under Shlomo Scharf and competed for Israel in three FIFA World Cup qualifying campaigns and UEFA European Football Championship qualifying campaigns in addition to 26 friendly matches.

Honours
Bnei Yehuda Tel Aviv
 Toto Cup: 1991–92

Maccabi Haifa
 State Cup: 1994–95

Fenerbahçe
 Süper Lig: 2000–01
 
Galatasaray
 Süper Lig: runner-up 2002–03

Individual
 Liga Leumit top scorer: 1994–95, 1995–96
 Best Player: 1994–95, 1995–96
Member of the Israeli Football Hall of Fame

References

External links
 
 
 

1972 births
Living people
Israeli Jews
Israeli footballers
Footballers from Ashdod
Association football wingers
Israel international footballers
Israeli businesspeople
Israeli Premier League players
Liga Leumit players
Süper Lig players
La Liga players
Hapoel Ashdod F.C. players
Gadna Tel Aviv Yehuda F.C. players
Bnei Yehuda Tel Aviv F.C. players
Hapoel Tel Aviv F.C. players
Maccabi Haifa F.C. players
RC Celta de Vigo players
Fenerbahçe S.K. footballers
Galatasaray S.K. footballers
F.C. Ashdod players
Israeli football chairmen and investors
Israeli expatriate footballers
Israeli expatriate sportspeople in Spain
Expatriate footballers in Spain
Israeli expatriate sportspeople in Turkey
Expatriate footballers in Turkey
Israeli people of Moroccan-Jewish descent
Israeli Footballer of the Year recipients